Chrysops clavicornis is a species of deer fly in the family Tabanidae.

Distribution
United States, Mexico.

References

Tabanidae
Insects described in 1935
Diptera of North America